United Nations Security Council resolution 1147, adopted unanimously on 13 January 1998, after recalling previous resolutions on Croatia including resolutions 779 (1992), 981 (1995), 1025 (1995), 1038 (1996), 1066 (1996), 1093 (1997) and 1119 (1997), the Council authorised the United Nations Mission of Observers in Prevlaka (UNMOP) to continue monitoring the demilitarisation in the Prevlaka peninsula area of Croatia until 15 July 1998.

The council welcomed that Croatia and the Federal Republic of Yugoslavia (Serbia and Montenegro) had made progress in adopting practical suggestions proposed by the United Nations military observers in May 1996 in order to reduce tension and improve safety and security in the area in addition to resolving the Prevlaka dispute. There was concern at long-standing violations of the demilitarisation regime, but noted that these had occurred less often. The presence of United Nations military observers remained essential for the negotiations.

The parties were urged to fully implement an agreement on the normalisation of their relations, to refrain from violence and to ensure freedom of movement to United Nations observers. The Secretary-General Kofi Annan was requested to report to the council on the situation by 5 July 1998 concerning progress towards a peaceful solution of the dispute between the two countries. Finally, the Stabilisation Force, authorised in Resolution 1088 (1996), were required to co-operate with UNMOP.

See also
 Breakup of Yugoslavia
 Croatian War of Independence
 List of United Nations Security Council Resolutions 1101 to 1200 (1997–1998)
 Yugoslav Wars

References

External links
 
Text of the Resolution at undocs.org

 1147
 1147
1998 in Yugoslavia
1998 in Croatia
 1147
January 1998 events